Evans Mukasa Kisekka (or Kiseka; born 1940) was an Anglican bishop who served in Uganda: he was Bishop of Luweero from 1996 to 2015.

References

21st-century Anglican bishops in Uganda
20th-century Anglican bishops in Uganda
Anglican bishops of Luweero
1940 births
Uganda Christian University alumni
Living people